The Bundi River is a river of the Democratic Republic of the Congo. It is a right tributary of the lower Congo River that enters the river below the Inga Falls.
If the proposed Grand Inga Dam project goes ahead, the river valley will be flooded to form a huge lake.

Early European visitors

In 1816 Captain James Hingston Tuckey of the British Royal Navy was the first European to visit the Bundi valley.
At that time the Inga plateau was the base of a chiefdom with 300 people and 70 huts. 
The market in Inga prospered from imposing levies on British, Portuguese, French and Belgian slave traders going up river, and on slave caravans coming down to the Atlantic coast.

Henry Morton Stanley visited in February 1880. 
He speculated that at some time in the past the Congo had run through the Bundi valley, leaving it almost completely level.
He wrote, "The Bundi is a beautiful stream of very clear water, brawling in the dry season over rocks and smoothly polished stones and pebbles at the bottom of a deep rocky valley.
He said that game was abundant, but unfortunately so were sand-flies, gad-flies and chigoes, while in the yellow creek the crocodiles were numerous.
He measured the distance from the Bundi to the Bula River as almost .

Guillaume Casman arrived in Vivi and joined an expedition led by Captain Edmond Hanssens.
They left on 21 January 1884 with a column of 30 men, and reached the banks of the Bundi River on 23 January 1884.
Rains had made it overflow its banks and turn its valley into a huge swamp.
The Swedish officer Peter August Möller passed the river when travelling from Vivi to Isangila. He wrote in 1887:

Grand Inga Dam

A 2013 BBC article said the DRC had signed a deal with South Africa to sell it power from the planned Grand Inga Dam hydroelectric power project.
A single dam wall would feed six power stations that would produce 40,000 megawatts of electricity.
The Congo River would now enter the north end of the lake, and leave through turbines at the dam across the south end.
In June 2020 it was reported that President Félix Tshisekedi was planning to present the Grand Inga projects to meetings of the Africans heads of state, to obtain expressions of interest in buying the energy that would be produced.

Opponents of the dam noted that the Bundi valley holds a combination of agricultural lands and natural environments that are home to wildlife.
Up to 60,000 people could be displaced, and the network of roads and power lines across the Congo Basin could cause create social and environmental damage.
No environmental impact study was planned.

Notes

Sources

Rivers of the Democratic Republic of the Congo